Hedesunda IF is a Swedish football club located in Hedesunda.

Background
Hedesunda IF currently plays in Division 4 Gestrikland which is the sixth tier of Swedish football. They play their home matches at the Hedesunda IP in Hedesunda.

The club is affiliated to Gestriklands Fotbollförbund. Hedesunda IF have competed in the Svenska Cupen on 10 occasions and have played 13 matches in the competition.

Season to season

In their most successful period Hedesunda IF competed in the following division:

In recent seasons Hedesunda IF have competed in the following divisions:

Footnotes

External links
 Hedesunda IF – Official website
 Hedesunda IF on Facebook

Sport in Gävleborg County
Football clubs in Gävleborg County
Association football clubs established in 1904
1904 establishments in Sweden